The 2019–20 Ligue Nationale du football Amateur was the eighth season of the league under its current title and eighth season under its current league division format, which serves as the third division of the Algerian league system. A total of 48 teams were contesting the league.

Stadiums and locations

League table

Groupe Est

Groupe Centre

Groupe Ouest

References

External links
 Ligue Nationale de Football Amateur
 Algerian Football Federation

Ligue Nationale du Football Amateur seasons
3
Algeria